Hiereiai (singular: hiereia) was the title of the female priesthood or priestesses in ancient Greek religion, being the equivalent of the male title Hierei.  Ancient Greece had a number of different offices in charge of worship of gods and goddesses, and both women and men functioned as priests.  While there were local variations depending on cult, the Hiereiai had many similarities across ancient Greece.  Normally, their office related only to a specific sanctuary or Greek temple.

Requirements

Local variations of cults made different requirements.  The most common rule was that goddesses had priestesses, and male gods had male priests.  The virgin goddess Artemis was, for example, served by young virgins, while Hera, goddess of marriage, was served by adult married women.  However, it was far from uncommon for there to be a staff of several different "temple servants" in each temple which included both men and women in different positions.

Appointment

There were mainly three methods in which a priestess was appointed: allotment, appointment, or inheritance.  Regardless of method, a religious official was normally chosen from among the elite class and aristocracy, as such an office had great prestige.

A priestess was counted among the public officials of the city, and her office was considered an honor and commemorated with pride by her family.  Some sanctuaries honored their priestesses with inscriptions and portrait statues.  For this reason, the education necessary for performing was often customarily given to all daughters of aristocratic families with the right position and status for being appointed to the office.

Duties
The priestess was the custodian of the keys to the temple.  She was the caretaker of the cult statue of the temple.  She was the chief of lesser office holders in the temple, such as temporary female temple servants who often served for shorter periods of time, and had a say in who should be appointed to such posts.  She officiated at sacred rituals, presided over and led rituals of worship, and performed ritual sacrifice.

While the duties of a priest or priestess differed between the local temples in which they served, there were some common similarities.  During the public festival of the divinity, the priestess participated in the sacred procession to the temple, often carrying sacred objects.  Upon arrival to the temple, she performed a public prayer on behalf of the city.  Before the prayer, she performed a libation (drink sacrifice).  She continued with a dedication or consecration, usually divided into the chernips or lustration (chernips), the throwing of barley groats (oulochytai), and then performed the prayer itself.  After this, the sacrifice was performed with the slaughter of the sacrificial animal.  The slaughter was sometimes followed by the search of omen.  After this, the flesh was divided between the god (by being burned at the altar) and the humans, which was followed by a holy public feast in which the people present dined in the presence of the divinity.

She also officiated at private rituals, when a private person wished to be initiated in a mystery, or wished to have a personal prayer said for them, for which she would receive a fee.

The priestess learned and preserved the sacred knowledge through generations, and was consulted as a religious authority.  She could for example be asked to found a new temple in a colony of the mother city, or give advice to a political power holder.

Privileges

The privileges of the priestess differed widely between temples.  Normally, the priestess was given an income from the city, since the office was regarded as a public office.  In addition to this, she was also awarded for each ritual and festival she participated in, and given fees for special rituals she performed for private people.  She was normally given a share in the sacrificial animals, such as the skins and furs of the dead animals.

The office of priestess of a temple had great prestige and high status, and priestesses were given many official privileges by their cities, such as reserved seats at public theaters and similar honors otherwise mainly given to male political and military figures.
It was common for the priestesses to be commemorated in public portrait statues at the temple in which they served, as well as elaborate public state funerals.

Career

In many cults, a priestess served only for a limited time.  This was especially true of virgin priestesses.  Priestesses required to be unmarried virgins during their tenure served for a limited time prior to marriage, often only a year, after which their successor was appointed.  The priestesses serving the cult of Athena Alea of Tegea, Artemis of Aigeira, Artemis Triklaria of Patrai, Artemis of Ephesus and Poseidon of Kalaureia all served only for a short time between that of reaching adulthood until their wedding.

In contrast some priestesses served for life. This was especially true in the case when the office was inherited and the requirement was the priestess was to be a mature married women. The priestess of Heraion of Argos, for example, who was a mature married woman, served for life.

Somewhat different were the number of Greek oracles, who had a similar position and are categorized as priestesses.

Impact

The Hiereiai priestesses were an influence in how the priestess office were conducted in Roman religion, which was heavily influenced by Greek traditions. The Greek priestesses continued to hold office until the Roman Empire became Christian, although the name of the office holders are only fragmentary preserved.

All priestess offices were banned when religious freedom was abolished during the Persecution of pagans in the late Roman Empire, specifically by the Emperor's Edict in 393.  This was in line with the Christian principle that women were not to hold priestly office. It appears that some early Christian women assumed that such offices were to become open to them in the worship of the holy virgin Mary, but the Christian church condemned such a thing as heresy.

Types of Hiereiai
 Athenai & High Priestess of Athena Polias
 Basilinna
 Gerarai 
 Peleiades
 High Priestess of Demeter
 Pythia

See also
 Eritha

References

 Joan Breton Connelly,   Portrait of a Priestess: Women and Ritual in Ancient Greece
 Stephanie Lynn Budin, Jean Macintosh Turfa, Women in Antiquity: Real Women across the Ancient World
 Judy Ann Turner, Hiereiai: acquisition of feminine priesthoods in ancient Greece, University of California, Santa Barbara, 1983
 Jennifer Larson, Jennifer Lynn Larson,  Ancient Greek Cults: A Guide

Ancient Greek priestesses
Persecution of pagans in the late Roman Empire